Filomena Dato Muruais (1856 - 1 May 1926) was a Spanish feminist and  writer in Castilian Spanish and the Galician language. Remaining in Galicia all her life, she joined movements associated with Galician culture and to liberate women from stigmatization. Of the three poetry books published by Spanish women in the 19th-century, one was by Dato.

Biography 
Filomena Dato was born in Ourense, 1856.
Little or almost nothing is known about Dato's life in a personal sense, beyond the great friendship that she established with her contemporaries Sofía Casanova and Emilia Pardo Bazán. Excluding this, most of her biographical data is related to her social and cultural work.

Dato wrote for various magazines and journals, and was awarded prizes. As with Catalan contemporaries, her early writing was in Castilian before she switched to Galician. Her poetic compositions were published in newspapers such as El Heraldo Gallego, Galicia Recreativa and Album Literario. She participated in the Rexurdimento, the literary movement that revitalized the Galician language as a means of expression, following in the likes of Valentín Lamas Carvajal.

Dato was a fervent feminist, in alignment with Rosalía de Castro. In fact, these two poets are the best representatives of the feminist lyric of 19th century Spain, in a historical context in which machismo was the dominant ideology, not only among people without cultural training, but also among intellectuals. These still asked questions such as if women had a soul, if they had conscience and remorse, or if they were the bearers of sin by inheritance from Eve, among others, being very frequent in social and philosophical debates. It was a time of adversity for women like Dato herself, Rosalía de Castro or Cecilia Böhl de Faber (Fernán Caballero), which gives her literary production greater value. The feminist claim and defense of the aforementioned woman is very present in ''Follatos'' (1891), her only book in the Galician language; it was dedicated to Infanta Sabela Francisca de Borbón. The book is a compilation of forty-five poems as a complaint against gender stereotypes, in addition to including a series of writings on religiosity and intimacy, very much in the line of typical 19th century Romanticism.

Dato continued to dedicate her life to the world of literature, despite the blindness that she was acquiring, practically until her death at age 70, in A Coruña, 1 May 1926.

Awards and honours
Dato received awards in numerous literary competitions. She won three awards in 1887 for her notable poem "Defensa das mulleres", in addition to being one of the five awarded poets at the Juegos Florales de Tui in 1891.

In 1906, she was appointed a corresponding member of the Real Academia Gallega, along with other contemporaries such as Carmen Beceiro, Emilia Calé and Sofía Casanova.

Selected works
 Punumbras, 1880
 Follatos, 1891
 co-author, Las mujeres españolas, americanas y lusitanas pintadas por sí mismas
 essay on Benito Jerónimo Feijoo's "Defensa de las mujeres"

References

Sources 
 Alvarellos, Enrique (1993). Mulleres destacadas de Galicia. ISBN 84-85311-96-5. (in Galician)
 Couceiro Freijomil, A. (1951). Diccionario Bio-bibliográfico de Escritores I. p. 342. Editorial de los Bibliófilos Gallegos. (in Spanish)
 Fernández del Riego, Francisco (1992). Diccionario de escritores en lingua galega. Sada: Ediciós do Castro. p. 110. (in Galician)
 Gran Enciclopedia Galega. 2005. ISBN 84-87804-88-8. (in Galician)
 VV.AA. (2010–2011). Dicionario biográfico de Galicia. 1. Ir Indo Edicións. p. 320. (in Galician)
 BIBLIOTECA VIRTUAL GALEGA (2006). (in Galician)

Further reading

External links 
 Filomena Dato at Álbum de Mujeres, Consejo de la Cultura Gallega
 Filomena Dato at Biblioteca Virtual Gallega
 Filomena Dato at Día de las escritoras

1856 births
1926 deaths
Spanish women poets
Galician poets
Blind writers
19th-century Spanish poets
Spanish feminist writers
People from Ourense
19th-century Spanish women writers
Spanish blind people